"What's the Use of Dreaming?" is a popular song written and sung by Joe Howard.  It appeared in shows in 1906 and 1907, and was a hit song in 1938. The song was revived for the 1947 biopic I Wonder Who's Kissing Her Now.

References

1938 songs
Songs written by Joseph E. Howard